The Alvis 4.3-litre and Alvis Speed 25 were British luxury touring cars announced in August 1936 and made until 1940 by Alvis Car and Engineering Company in Coventry. They replaced the Alvis Speed 20 2.8-litre and 3.5-litre. They were widely considered one of the finest cars produced in the 1930s.

New engines
The Speed Twenty’s 2.5-litre, 2.8-litre or 3.5-litre engines with four main bearings were replaced in the 4.3-litre and 3.5-litre Speed Twenty-Five with a strengthened newly designed six-cylinder in-line unit now with seven main bearings.

Chassis
The leaf springs at the rear were  longer than on the previous model. The brakes had servo assistance.

Coachwork
Alvis did not make any of the bodies for the Speed 25. The cars were supplied in chassis form and firms such as Cross & Ellis (standard tourer) Charlesworth (standard saloon and Drop Head Coupé) as well as Vanden Plas, Lancefield, Offord and
others would fit suitably elegant open touring or saloon car bodies.
The car was built on a heavy steel chassis with a substantial cross brace. With its sporty low slung aspect, all-synchro gearbox, independent front suspension and servo-assisted brakes, this was a fast, reliable and beautifully made car, although at almost £1000 it was not cheap. The survival rate for what was after all a hand-built car is surprisingly good. Later models featured increased chassis boxing, and to reduce the car’s weight Alvis cut numerous holes in the chassis box sections, which was also a solution tried less successfully earlier in the decade by Mercedes-Benz when confronting the same challenge with their enormously heavy Mercedes-Benz SSKL.

Minor improvements
Minor improvements to both cars announced at the October 1938 Motor Show included a dual exhaust system said to quieten the engine and improve power output.

From the show the press reported the 4.3-litre four-door sports saloon to have "a most imposing front with very large headlamps, fog and pass lights, and post horns."

There were to be only detail changes for 1940

References

External links

 Alvis 4.3 litre -four door saloon & pillarless saloon by Vanden Plas- sales brochure 1936 (Including prices for fitted raw chassis, Standard Four Door Saloon, and Pillarless Saloon by Vander Plas)
 4.3-litre Pillarless Saloon by Vanden Plas, 4-Door sports saloon by Arthur Mulliner and Alvis Standard 4-Door Saloon- sales brochure September 1936
 Alvis archive

Speed 25
Cars introduced in 1937
1940s cars